Motilibacter is a genus of bacteria from the class Actinomycetia.

References

Actinomycetota
Bacteria genera